The Heroine of the Yangs (穆桂英) is a 2-season ATV series aired in Hong Kong in 1998, starring Amy Chan as the titular heroine Muk Gwai-ying of the Yang (Yeung in Cantonese) family. It is an adaptation of the Generals of the Yang Family legends.

Seasons

Story
The story is about the women generals of the Yang Family going to war and the power struggle between two countries Song and the Liu.  Amy Chan (陳秀雯) stars as the historical character Mui Gui-ying (穆桂英) from the ancient story of Yang's saga (楊家將).

Production note
Many variations of dramas, films and Chinese Opera have been made in relation to the Yang saga stories between Hong Kong, mainland China and other Chinese speaking regions.

The opening song "Riding handsomely" (馬上英姿) was sung by Amy Chan, while the insert song: "Everlasting Love" (情緣萬世長) was performed by both Amy Chan and Johnny Yip.

Cast
 Note: The characters' names are in Cantonese romanisation.

External links
 Opening theme

Asia Television original programming
Works based on The Generals of the Yang Family
Television series set in the Northern Song
Television series set in the Liao dynasty
Television series set in the Western Xia
Television shows set in Kaifeng